The 47th Operations Group (47 OG) is the flying component of the 47th Flying Training Wing, assigned to the United States Air Force Air Education and Training Command. The group is stationed at Laughlin Air Force Base, Texas.

Overview
The 47th Operations Group contains five flying squadrons, one support squadron, and a maintenance flight. The Operations Group is responsible for training US Air Force and allied nation pilots under the Specialized Undergraduate Pilot Training Program (SUPT).

The group provides management, control, and standardization/evaluation of all aspects of flying training operations, aircraft maintenance, and airfield management at Laughlin AFB, Texas.

Components
Squadrons of the 47th Operations Group (Tail Code: XL) are:
 47th Operations Support Squadron
 434th Fighter Training Squadron, T-6 Texan II, Red Tail Stripe, "Red Devils"
 85th Flying Training Squadron, T-6 Texan II, Yellow Tail Stripe, "Tigers"
 86th Flying Training Squadron, T-1 Jayhawk, Black Tail Stripe, "Rio Lobos"
 87th Flying Training Squadron, T-38 Talon, "Red Bulls"
 96th Flying Training Squadron, T-1A, T-6, T-38 (AFRES)

History
 See 47th Flying Training Wing for additional history and lineage information

World War II

Constituted as 47th Bombardment Group (Light) on 20 November 1940, and activated on 15 January 1941. Operational squadrons of the group were:

 84th Bombardment Squadron 1941–1949
 85th Bombardment Squadron 1941–1949
 86th Bombardment Squadron 1941–1949
 97th Bombardment Squadron 1941–1946

Initially based at McChord Field, Washington, the group's mission was to perform anti-submarine patrols along the Pacific coast with the Douglas B-18 Bolo its primary aircraft. This was a short-lived mission, however, as after Japan attacked Pearl Harbor, the group began training for duty overseas when it was assigned Douglas A-20Cs which were taken over by the USAAF from Lend-Lease contracts.

Training at several bases in the midwest and southeast, it was first believed that the 47th would be sent to the South Pacific. However shortly after Operation Torch, the Allied invasion of North Africa in November 1942, the 47th became the first USAAF A-20 group to participate in large-scale combat in the North African Campaign, being assigned to Twelfth Air Force.

Flying to a former Vichy French Air Force base at Mediouni, French Morocco. the aircrews used ferry tanks on their A-20s to cross the North Atlantic. The group began operations by flying low-level missions against the enemy in North Africa flying its first combat mission from Youks-les-Bains, Algeria on 13 December 1942.

47th Group A-20s provided valuable tactical support to US and British ground forces, especially during and after the allied defeat at the Battle of the Kasserine Pass. Though undermanned and undersupplied, the group flew eleven missions on 22 February to attack the advancing Nazi armored columns and thus to help stop the enemy's offensive-an action which helped save the day, and eventually the Germans were forced back into a small perimeter in Tunisia. For these actions, the group was awarded a Distinguished Unit Citation.

The 47th remained active in combat during March and April 1943 while training for medium level bombardment. In 1943 the group was upgraded to the A-20G, which increased their forward firepower during low-level strafing missions. Moving to Malta, the group participated in the reduction of Pantelleria and Lampedusa (Operation Corkscrew) in June 1943 and the invasion of Sicily (Operation Husky) in July. The group also bombed German evacuation beaches near Messina in August.

The group supported the British Eighth Army during the invasion of Italy in September. Moving to Italy as part of the Italian Campaign, the group assisted the Allied advance toward Rome, September 1943 – June 1944 at the battles of the Bernhardt Line, Monte Cassino, and Operation Shingle. The 47th began flying numerous night intruder missions after June 1944, and supported the invasion of Southern France from bases in Corsica and also in France during August–September 1944.

Returning to Italy, the group attacked German communications in northern Italy, 1 September – 4 April 1945. Received a second DUC for performance from to 21–24 April 1945 when, in bad weather and over rugged terrain, the group maintained operations for 60 consecutive hours, destroying enemy transportation in the Po Valley to prevent the organized withdrawal of German forces.

After January 1945, the 47th received some new Douglas A-26Cs which flew alongside its A-20s during the last four months of the war for specialized night attacks. The group flew support and interdictory operations attacking such targets as tanks, convoys, bivouac areas, troop concentrations, supply dumps, roads, pontoon bridges, rail lines, and airfields. The A-26 was regarded as being the USAAF's best twin-engined bomber, and plans were being made for the conversion of the 47th to the type.

The 47th Bombardment Group returned to the United States in July 1945 and was reassigned to Seymour Johnson Field, North Carolina. Its mission was to prepare for redeployment to the Pacific Theater for night pathfinder operations against Japan. Its black-painted A-26Cs were equipped with radar however the surrender by Japan in August 1945, cancelled all redeployment plans.

Postwar era

With the closing of Seymour Johnson in August 1945, the group was reassigned to Lake Charles Army Air Field, Louisiana and was equipped with the Douglas A-26 Invader. The A-26 was selected as the standard light bomber and night reconnaissance aircraft of the postwar USAAF, primarily as the main offensive light bomber of the Tactical Air Command which was created in 1946 out of the remnants of the wartime 9th and 12th Air Forces. At Lake Charles, the unit trained in night tactical operations, conducted firepower demonstrations, and participated in tactical exercises.

The group was moved Biggs Field, Texas in October 1946 when Lake Charles became a Strategic Air Command (SAC) base. At Biggs, the Group was reduced from four to three tactical squadrons when the 97th Bombardment Squadron was inactivated.  In August 1947, as the Air Force reorganized under the wing base organization, which placed tactical and support organizations on a base under a single wing commander, the group was reassigned to the 47th Bombardment Wing.

On 1 February 1948, Biggs was also turned over to SAC, forcing a relocation of the group to Barksdale Air Force Base, Louisiana in November. In the fall of 1948 North American B-45 Tornado bombers began to be delivered to the group, which became the first in the Air Force to fly the aircraft. The 47th was inactivated at Barksdale 2 October 1949 as a result of budgetary reductions. However the 84th and 85th Squadrons continued with the B-45's and moved to Langley AFB, Virginia where they were attached to the 363d Tactical Reconnaissance Wing.

Cold War

On 12 March 1951, the 47th Bombardment Group was reactivated at Langley Air Force Base, Virginia, with tactical squadrons the 84th and 85th. The group was the only Jet-Medium Bomber Group in the Air Force. After becoming proficient in the handling and use of nuclear weapons, moved to RAF Sculthorpe, United Kingdom where it began operations there on 1 June 1952.

For nearly three years, the 47th Bombardment Group provided an in-place Atomic Air Strike Force to back up NATO Ground Forces in Europe. Operational missions of the group were training for tactical bombardment training operations, including participation in exercises and firepower demonstrations in support of NATO.

Owing to the small size of Sculthorpe, the group operated two B-45A jet bomber squadrons (84th and 85th) from Sculthorpe. In March 1954, a third B-45A jet bomber squadron (86th) was assigned to the wing, but operated from RAF Alconbury in order to accommodate the additional aircraft.

A few months after moving to England that year, the group ceased operations and remained a paper organization until inactivation again in 1955 as a result of the Air Force tri-deputate reorganization.

Modern era

The group was reactivated on 9 December 1991 as the 47th Operations Group and assigned to the 47th Flying Training Wing as part of the "Objective Wing" concept adapted by the Air Force. The 47th OG was bestowed the lineage, honors and history of the 47th Bombardment Group and its predecessor units.

The 47OG was assigned the flying components of the wing, and since its reactivation has USAF and Allied pilots using various types of trainer aircraft.

Lineage
 Constituted as the 47th Bombardment Group (Light) on 20 November 1940
 Activated on 15 January 1941
 Redesignated 47th Bombardment Group, Light on 20 August 1943
 Redesignated 47th Bombardment Group, Light (Night Attack) on 1 May 1946
 Redesignated 47th Bombardment Group, Light on 22 August 1948
 Inactivated on 2 October 1949
 Activated on 12 March 1951
 Inactivated on 8 February 1955
 Redesignated 47th Operations Group on 9 December 1991
 Activated on 15 December 1991

Assignments
 General Headquarters Air Force (later, Air Force Combat Command), 15 January 1941
 Attached to: Northwest Air District (later Second Air Force), 15 January-14 August 1941
 15th Bombardment Wing (Light), 14 August 1941
 IV Air Support Command, 1 September 1941
 Attached to IV Bomber Command, 17 December 1941 – 15 February 1942
 Second Air Force, 15 February 1942
 III Bomber Command, 1 May 1942
 Attached to III Ground Air Support Command, 29 June-10 August 1942
 III Ground Air Support Command, 10 August 1942
 XII Air Support Command, 27 September 1942
 Moroccan Composite Wing, 31 December 1942
 XII Air Support Command, 22 January 1943
 Twelfth Air Force, 18 February 1943
 Attached to: Northwest African Tactical Air Force, 18 February-20 March 1943
 Attached to: Northwest African Tactical Bomber Force, 20 March-1 September 1943
 Attached to: XII Air Support Command, 1 September-6 October 1943
 Attached to: 57th Bombardment Wing [Medium], 6 October-10 December 1943
 Attached to: XII Air Support Command (later XII Tactical Air Command), 10 December 1943 – 20 July 1944
 Attached to: 87th Fighter Wing, 20 July-7 September 1944
 Attached to: XII Tactical Air Command, 7–15 September 1944
 Attached to: XII Fighter Command [later, XXII Tactical Air Command] , 15 September 1944 – 7 June 1945
 I Bomber Command, 11 July 1945
 Third Air Force, 7 February 1946
 Tactical Air Command, 21 March 1946
 Ninth Air Force, 29 May 1946
 Twelfth Air Force, 1 November 1946
 47th Bombardment Wing, 15 August 1947 – 2 October 1949
 47th Bombardment Wing, 12 March 1951 – 8 February 1955
 47th Flying Training Wing, 15 December 1991 – present

Components
 20th Reconnaissance Squadron (later 97th Bombardment Squadron): attached 15 January-14 August 1941, assigned 14 August 1941 – 31 March 1946
 84th Bombardment Squadron: 15 January 1941 – 2 October 1949; 12 March 1951 – 8 February 1955 (detached 17 November 1952 – 8 February 1955)
 84th Flying Training Squadron: 15 December 1991 – 1 October 1992; 1 October 1998  – present
 85th Bombardment (later, 85th Flying Training): 15 January 1941 – 2 October 1949; 12 March 1951 – 8 February 1955 (detached 17 November 1952 – 8 February 1955); 15 December 1991–present
 86th Bombardment (later, 86th Flying Training): 15 January 1941 – 2 October 1949; 23 March 1954 – 8 February 1955 (detached 23 March 1954 – 8 February 1955); 15 December 1991 – 15 September 1992; 1 December 1993 – present
 87th Flying Training Squadron: 15 December 1991 – present
 97th Bombardment Squadron: 8 May-13 August 1941; 14 August 1941 – 31 March 1946
 115th Bombardment Squadron: attached 17 May 1951 – 12 February 1952
 422d Bombardment Squadron: 8 February - 23 March 1954 (detached 8 February - 23 March 1954)
 434th Fighter Training Squadron: 19 July 2007 – present

Stations

 McChord Field, Washington, 15 January 1941
 Hammer Field, California, 14 August 1941
 Will Rogers Field, Oklahoma, c. 16 February 1942
 Greensboro Airport, North Carolina, c. 16 July-18 October 1942
 Médiouna Airfield, French Morocco, 18 November 1942
 Youks-les-Bains Airfield, Algeria, 7 January 1943
 Canrobert Airfield, Algeria, 6 March 1943
 Thelepte Airfield, Tunisia, 30 March 1943
 Souk-el-Arba Airfield, Tunisia, 13 April 1943
 Soliman Airfield, Tunisia, c. 1 July 1943
 Ta' Qali Airfield, Malta, 21 July 1943
 Torrente Comunelli Airfield, Sicily, Italy, 9 August 1943
 Gerbini Airfield, Sicily, Italy, 20 August 1943
 Grottaglie Airfield, Italy, 24 September 1943
 Vincenzo Airfield, Italy, 15 October 1943
 Vesuvius Airfield, Italy, c. 10 January 1944
 Capodichino Airport (Naples), Italy, 22 March 1944

 Vesuvius Airfield, Italy, 25 April 1944
 Ponte Galeria Airfield, Italy, c. 10 June 1944
 Ombrone Airfield, Italy, 27 June 1944
 Poretta Airfield, Corsica, France, 11 July 1944
 Salon de Provence Airfield (Y-16), France, 7 September 1944
 Follonica Airfield, Italy, 18 September 1944
 Rosignano Airfield, Italy, October 1944
 Grosseto Airfield, Italy, 11 December 1944
 Pisa Airfield, Italy, 20–24 June 1945
 Seymour Johnson Field, North Carolina, 14 July 1945
 Lake Charles Army Air Field, Louisiana, c. 9 September 1945
 Biggs Field (later Biggs Air Force Base), Texas, 20 October 1946
 Barksdale Air Force Base, Louisiana, 19 November 1948 – 2 October 1949
 Langley Air Force Base, Virginia, 12 March 1951 – 21 May 1952
 Sculthorpe RAF Station (later, RAF Sculthorpe), England, 1 June 1952 – 8 February 1955
 Laughlin Air Force Base, Texas, 15 December 1991–present

Aircraft assigned
 Primarily B-18 Bolo, but included DB-7 Boston and LB-30 Liberator, 1941–1942
 A-20 Havoc, 1941–1945
 Douglas A-26 (later B-26) Invader, 1945–1949
 North American B-45 Tornado, 1949
 Primarily B-45 Tornado, 1951–1952, but included Douglas B-26 Invader and F-84 Thunderstreak, 1951
 T-37 Tweet, 1972–2004
 T-38 Talon, 1972–present
 T-1 Jayhawk, 1993–present
 T-6 Texan II, 2002–present

See also

References

Notes

Bibliography

External links

047